Patty Lin is an American television screenwriter and producer.  She is a graduate of Cornell University

Career
She has written episodes for the television series Friends, Freaks and Geeks, Martial Law, Citizen Baines, Desperate Housewives, Leap of Faith, and Breaking Bad.

She has served as producer for a number of episodes from Desperate Housewives, Leap of Faith, and Citizen Baines, as well as executive story editor for five Friends episodes.

Lin joined the crew of the first season of Breaking Bad in 2008 as a writer and producer. She wrote the first-season episode "Gray Matter". The first season writing staff were nominated for the Writers Guild of America (WGA) Award for best new series at the February 2009 ceremony. Lin was personally nominated for the WGA award for best episodic drama for writing "Gray Matter".

References

External links

American people of Chinese descent
American screenwriters
American soap opera writers
American television producers
American women television producers
Cornell University alumni
Living people
Soap opera producers
American women screenwriters
American women television writers
Year of birth missing (living people)
Women soap opera writers
21st-century American women